Health and Strength is an album by Prince Far I recorded in the late 1970s but not released until 1998.

Recording
It was recorded for Virgin Records' Front Line label between 1978 and 1979 but the master tapes were lost en route to Virgin's offices. In 1997, a former staff member for Hit Run records (the label run by Adrian Sherwood, with whom Prince Far I worked for several years) discovered a cassette that he had made from the master tapes, and the album was finally released by Pressure Sounds.

The album features several tracks based on Gregory Isaacs songs - "Brother Joe", "Health Warning" (which uses Isaacs' "Sacrifice" as its basis), and "House of Jah" (which is based on "Handcuff"). The album also features DJ Blackskin Prophet (on "When the King Comes to Earth"), and includes the Jamaican singles "Frontline Speech" and "Weatherman Tam". The album is unusual as it features Prince Far I singing as well as chanting, and is regarded as one of Far I's strongest albums.

Track listing
"Frontline Speech"
"Brother Joe"
"House Of Jah"
"Health Warning"
"Weatherman Tam"
"When The King Comes"
"Easy Squeeze"
"Solomon´s Wisdom"
"The Will To Win"
"Clean Hands Pure Heart"
"Leave Babylon"

Personnel
Prince Far I - vocals, production
Carlton "Santa" Davis - drums
Sly Dunbar - drums
Eric "Fish" Clarke - drums
Lincoln "Style" Scott - drums
Flabba Holt - bass guitar
Bertram "Ranchie" McLean - bass guitar
Robbie Shakespeare - bass guitar
Clinton Jack - bass guitar
Bingy Bunny - guitar
"Crucial" Tony Phillips - guitar
Earl "Chinna" Smith - guitar
Noel "Sowell" Bailey - guitar
Dougie Bryan - guitar
Clifton "Bigga" Morrison - keyboards
Wycliffe "Steele" Johnson - keyboards
Ansel Collins - keyboards
Ossie Hibbert - keyboards
Sticky - percussion
Dr. Pablo - melodica

References

External links
Health and Strength at Roots Archives

1998 albums
Albums published posthumously
Prince Far I albums